Young men may refer to:

Adolescent males
Young Men (Lebanon), a Lebanese Christian militia during the Lebanese Civil War 1978–1986
Young Men (organization), a Mormon youth organization
The Young Men, a 1968–1971 Hong Kong folk/rock band
Young Men, a 1950s superhero comic published by Atlas Comics